"Educational Series" is the informal name used by numismatists to refer to a series of United States silver certificates produced by the U.S. Treasury in 1896, after its Bureau of Engraving and Printing chief Claude M. Johnson ordered a new currency design. The notes depict various allegorical motifs and are considered by some  numismatists to be the most beautiful monetary designs ever produced by the United States.

Design

The obverse of the notes depict a neoclassical allegorical motif, which dominates the front of the note.  The motifs are meant as representations of the theme written on the note. The back contained the profiles of two American figures (usually famous Americans) set against an ornate background.

Denominations of $1, $2, and $5 were produced.  In addition to $1, $2 and $5 notes denominations of  $10, $20, $50, $100, $500 and $1000 were also planned.  Designs for a $10 and $50 denomination were being prepared but were never completed or produced before the series was abandoned and replaced by the series of 1899.

The term "Educational" is derived from the title of the vignette on the $1 note, ''History Instructing Youth.''

Design and production credits

$1 History instructing Youth
Front Face Designer: Will Hicok Low
Engraver: Charles Schlecht
Rear Back Designer: Thomas F. Morris
George Washington Vignette Engraver:  Alfred Sealey (1867)
Martha Washington Vignette Engraver:  Charles Burt (1878)

$2 Science presenting steam and electricity to Commerce and Manufacture
Four artists were commissioned by the BEP to produce key artwork including E. H. Blashfield, Will H. Low, C. S. Reinhart, and Walter Shirlaw.
Other design and engraving work is as follows.
Central Vignette Designer: E. H. Blashfield
Central Frame and Background Designer: Thomas F. Morris
Vignette Engraver: George F. C. Smillie
Border Engraver: Charles Schlecht
Rear Back Designer: Thomas F. Morris
Robert Fulton and Samuel F.B. Morse Vignette Engraver: Lorenzo J. Hatch

$5 Electricity as the Dominant Force in the World
Central Vignette Designer: Walter Shirlaw
Border Designer: Thomas F. Morris
Central Vignette Engraver: G. F. C. Smillie
Border Engraver: Thomas F. Morris
Rear Back Designer: Lorenzo J. Hatch and Thomas F. Morris
Rear Back Engraver: G. F. C. Smillie
Ulysses S. Grant and Phillip Sheridan Vignette Engraver: Lorenzo J. Hatch

Controversy

The naked breasts of the female figures on the $5 silver certificate reportedly caused some minor controversy when several Boston society ladies took offense to the design. Some bankers reportedly refused to accept the notes in transactions, and the term banned in Boston allegedly originates from the $5 silver certificate. In response, the Bureau of Engraving and Printing prepared a "draped" bosom $5 vignette design for a proposed 1897 series. The redesign also included a highly modified front face but was never utilized.

Also for the first time in 1893, Bureau authorities invited a small group of outside artists and engravers to submit design proposals for the new series of notes. The presence of the outside group caused tremendous creative problems within the BEP. Great personality conflicts and jealousy could be one reason that, although the $1 design was approved in July, 1894, the remaining two notes were not accepted until late 1895. At one point during the process, BEP designer Thomas Morris resigned. Coupled with being banned in Boston, the notes were quickly replaced by the Series of 1899 notes.

Notes

References

Stacks Bowers Auction Catalog "The Harry W. Bass, Jr. Collection Part V", August 17, 2011 https://web.archive.org/web/20120421131411/http://stacksbowers.com/auctions/auctionlots.aspx?auctionid=115&sessionid=212

GREYSHEET & CPG PRICE GUIDE, U.S. Currency / Large Size Notes / 1896 Silver Certificates https://www.greysheet.com/coin-prices/series/silver-certificates--large/1896

External links
 A Guide Book Of United States Paper Money: Complete Source for History, Grading, and Prices by Arthur L. Friedberg (Compiler), Ira S. Friedberg (Compiler), and Q. David Bowers. 
FRBSF Currency Exhibit

Portions of this article used material from the Federal Reserve Bank of San Francisco website, which is in the public domain.

Paper money of the United States
1896 in the United States